Guy Wesley Peterson (born December 26, 1953) is an American architect based in Sarasota, Florida. Peterson is a Fellow of the American Institute of Architects and the recipient of the AIA Florida Gold Medal for his outstanding contributions to architecture.  He has designed more than 200 structures in southwest Florida, including notable private and public works. Peterson is an adjunct professor of architecture at the University of Florida, College of Design, Construction and Planning, and the author of Naked: The Architecture of Guy Peterson.

Personal life, career, and influences

Peterson was born to Wesley and Joan Peterson, in Cheyenne, Wyoming. Shortly after his birth, Peterson's physician father moved to Sarasota, Florida to open a medical practice. Living in Sarasota, his adolescence was spent surrounded by great architecture. A movement known as the Sarasota School of Architecture was founded there, and the community was replete with dozens of examples of it. Peterson lived near the Sanderling Beach Club and attended high school at Riverview High School, both designs by architect Paul Rudolph. He was particularly influenced by the Syd Solomon Studio on Siesta Key by Gene Leedy. He attended college at the University of Florida, earning a bachelor's degree in design and a master's degree in architecture. After a brief stint in Tallahassee, he opened an architecture office in Sarasota in the late 1980s, offering both commercial and residential design services. 

Over the next four decades, Peterson designed more than 200 structures in southwest Florida. His most well-known private works are Spencer House, Theisen House, Freund House, Ashridge House, Durbin House, Ohana Retreat, and Anaclerio House. His public work includes Girl Scout Gulf Coast Headquarters, Sarasota Memorial Hospital Critical Care Center, SPARCC Shelter, Selby Memorial, Midway Fire Station, Longboat Key Police Station, the Elling Eide Center, and the Nathan Benderson Park Finish Tower.

Throughout his career, Peterson has done numerous pro-bono projects for non-profit organizations, including the creation of UF CityLab Sarasota and the renovation and preservation of several historic Sarasota School designs. Peterson restored the architecturally significant Revere Quality House in 2007 and it was added to the U.S. National Register of Historic Places the following year. He also restored the Scott Building (designed by Paul Rudolph assistants William Rupp and Joseph Farrell), converting it into the Center for Architecture Sarasota, a community-based architecture/cultural organization. Renamed the McCulloch Pavilion, the renovated work was included in the U.S. National Register of Historic Places in 2017.

Peterson is still a frequent lecturer on architecture and an adjunct professor of architecture at the University of Florida.

Notable career achievements
The American Institute of Architects Florida Gold Medal was awarded to Peterson in 2016, (Paul Rudolph being the only other recipient of the award from Sarasota). Peterson was elected into the College of Fellows of the American Institute of Architects in 2003. He received the AIA Florida Presidential Millennium Award of Honor for Design in 2000. Guy Peterson Office For Architecture was awarded AIA Florida Firm of the Year in 2013.

He has also been recognized for career achievement by the University of Florida School of Architecture (Ivan H. Smith Eminent Chair - Endowed Professorship, Distinguished Architecture Alumnus Award, and Dean's Faculty Service Award), the Sarasota Architectural Foundation (Lifetime Achievement Award), and the American Jewish Committee (Civic Achievement Award).

Peterson has earned more than 80 individual architectural design awards throughout his career.

Bibliography and media
Peterson's work has been featured in several architectural reference books:

Peterson's architecture has been featured several times on television, including HGTV’s, Homes Across America (Theisen House and Freund House) and Open House (Freund House) on SNN. In 2018, Peterson's Spencer House was selected for the television show The World's Most Extraordinary Homes, (Season 2, Episode 4 "USA"), broadcast worldwide on the BBC and on Netflix.

Selected architecture / design awards
The American Institute of Architects – AIA Florida – Award for Excellence in Architecture:
2017 Elling Eide Center - Honor Award of Excellence – Sarasota, Florida
2014 Spencer House – Honor Award of Excellence – Sarasota, Florida
2011 Revere Quality House Addition & Restoration - Honor Award of Excellence – Sarasota, Florida
2001 Freund House – Honor Award – Siesta Key, Florida
1999 Theisen House – Bradenton, Florida
1998 Test of Time Award of Honor In Design

The American Institute of Architects (Florida) – Unbuilt Design Award:
2016 Nathan Benderson Park Finish Tower - Honor Award – Sarasota, Florida

The American Institute of Architects (Florida) – Excellence for Historic Preservation and Restoration:
2015 Center For Architecture Sarasota | UF CityLab Sarasota – Honor Award – Sarasota, Florida

The American Institute of Architects – Florida Gulf Coast Chapter – Award of Excellence in Architecture:
2014 Durbin House – Award of Excellence – Casey Key, Florida
2012 Spencer Residence – Award of Excellence – Sarasota, Florida
1997 Theisen House – Bradenton, Florida

References

External links
 Guy Peterson Office For Architecture website
 Center For Architecture Sarasota website

1953 births
Architects from Florida
Modernist architects from the United States
University of Florida alumni
Modernist architecture in Florida
People from Sarasota, Florida
Living people
People from Cheyenne, Wyoming
Fellows of the American Institute of Architects
Riverview High School (Sarasota, Florida) alumni